Steven "Steve" Engler (born November 6, 1949) is an American politician and farmer.

Early life and education 
Engler was born in Randolph, Minnesota and graduated from Randolph High School in 1967. He received his bachelor's degree in history and economics from Minnesota State University, Mankato in 1971.

Career 
Engler lived in Randolph, Minnesota, and was a farmer. He served in the Minnesota Senate from 1977 to 1982 and was a Republican.

References

1949 births
Living people
People from Dakota County, Minnesota
Minnesota State University, Mankato alumni
Farmers from Minnesota
Republican Party Minnesota state senators